Transe is a 2006 Portuguese film directed by Teresa Villaverde. It won a Special Jury Award at the 2007 Lecce Festival of European Cinema.

Plot

Sonia is a young woman born and raised in St. Peters burg Russia. Her life in Russia falls apart after her family and work life crumbles.  Sonia leaves  Russia for Germany in search of a better life with a group of other immigrants. Sonia Eventually arrives in Germany and is employed at a car dealership. One day, an individual comes to the dealership informing Sonia that all the immigrants and her passport have been taken by immigration authorities. Having no choice, Sonia gets into the car with the individual who promises her escape from immigration custody. Sonia falls asleep while traveling and eventually another man who identifies as Russian enters the car and begins driving. Sonia eventually realizes something is wrong and manages to get out of the car after protesting, but is left in the wilderness. Sonia is eventually picked back up by the man as she falls unconsciousness in the wilderness. The man takes Sonia to a hotel where she is bathed and forced to sleep with the man. Sonia eventually asks for what is happening and the man confesses that she is being sold to the "Italians" and he is delivering her to them.

Sonia is then transported via vehicle to another man who takes her to a brothel. At the brothel, Sonia is kept against her will to work as a reluctant and resistant prostitute who is abused due to her resistance and is unable to communicate with anyone as everyone only speaks Italian. Sonia eventually retreats into herself and refuses to eat and drink. Due to her resistance, it is implied that she is sold and held by a wealthy family living in a villa in Italy.

Her new captors are a rich Italian family  consisting of a father and his 2 sons one of which is mentally handicapped. Sonia is kept locked in a lighted room which only the father has a key to. Sonia is catatonic while listening and watching what the sons talk about what they want to do to her. One night,  The younger son eventually steals the key to get into the room. Once inside the room, the elder soon duct tapes the younger son to a chair and then proceeds to rape Sonia in front of his younger brother. Later, the younger son steals the key by himself to get into the room with Sonia, but converses with Sonia and Sonia manages to escape while the son is attempting to converse with Sonia. The son eventually tells his father that she let Sonia go. The father makes phone calls to ensure her recapture.

There is a montage of events after her capture and before her leaving Russia which includes her torture for her escape attempt from the Italian family which is implied she is forced to endure bestiality as well as flashbacks to her life in Russia. The final scene is Sonia conversing with a new man who claims to of seen her before who gives her a drink and the 2 ask the same questions giving the same vague response to one another which is implied to be that Sonia has lost her mind due to her situation and is unable to think anymore. After conversing with the man, Sonia lays down on the bed and the screen cuts to black.

Cast
Ana Moreira
Robinson Stévenin

References

External links
 
Review at Variety

2006 films
Films directed by Teresa Villaverde
2000s German-language films
2000s Italian-language films
Portuguese drama films
2000s Portuguese-language films
2000s Russian-language films
2006 multilingual films
Portuguese multilingual films